In functional analysis, a topological vector space (TVS)  is called ultrabornological if every bounded linear operator from  into another TVS is necessarily continuous. A general version of the closed graph theorem holds for ultrabornological spaces. 
Ultrabornological spaces were introduced by Alexander Grothendieck (Grothendieck [1955, p. 17] "espace du type (β)").

Definitions 

Let  be a topological vector space (TVS).

Preliminaries 

A disk is a convex and balanced set.  
A disk in a TVS  is called bornivorous if it absorbs every bounded subset of   

A linear map between two TVSs is called infrabounded if it maps Banach disks to bounded disks.   

A disk  in a TVS  is called infrabornivorous if it satisfies any of the following equivalent conditions:
 absorbs every Banach disks in 

while if  locally convex then we may add to this list:

while if  locally convex and Hausdorff then we may add to this list:
 absorbs all compact disks; that is,  is "compactivorious".

Ultrabornological space 

A TVS  is ultrabornological if it satisfies any of the following equivalent conditions:

while if  is a locally convex space then we may add to this list:
every bounded linear operator from  into a complete metrizable TVS is necessarily continuous;
every infrabornivorous disk is a neighborhood of 0;
a seminorm on  that is bounded on each Banach disk is necessarily continuous;
for every locally convex space  and every linear map  if  is bounded on each Banach disk then  is continuous;
for every Banach space  and every linear map  if  is bounded on each Banach disk then  is continuous.

while if  is a Hausdorff locally convex space then we may add to this list:
 is an inductive limit of Banach spaces;

Properties 

Every locally convex ultrabornological space is barrelled, quasi-ultrabarrelled space, and a bornological space but there exist bornological spaces that are not ultrabornological.

Every ultrabornological space  is the inductive limit of a family of nuclear Fréchet  spaces, spanning 
Every ultrabornological space  is the inductive limit of a family of nuclear DF-spaces, spanning

Examples and sufficient conditions 

The finite product of locally convex ultrabornological spaces is ultrabornological. Inductive limits of ultrabornological spaces are ultrabornological.  

Every Hausdorff sequentially complete bornological space is ultrabornological.  Thus every complete Hausdorff bornological space is ultrabornological.  In particular, every Fréchet space is ultrabornological.  

The strong dual space of a complete Schwartz space is ultrabornological.  

Every Hausdorff bornological space that is quasi-complete is ultrabornological.  

Counter-examples

There exist ultrabarrelled spaces that are not ultrabornological.  
There exist ultrabornological spaces  that are not ultrabarrelled.

See also

External links 

 Some characterizations of ultrabornological spaces

References 

 
  
  
  
  
  
  
  
  

Topological vector spaces